This is a chronological list of the battles involving the Kingdom of Scotland.

The list gives the name, the date, the present-day location of the battles, the Scottish allies and enemies, and the result of these conflicts following this legend:

Early battles (875–1275)

First War of Scottish Independence (1296–1327)

Second War of Scottish Independence (1332–1357)

Border Wars

Hundred Years' War (1337-1453)

Anglo-Scottish wars

Nine Years' War (Sometimes called The Rough Wooing)

Border skirmishes

See also
Military history of Scotland

 

Battles
Scotland